Hochelaga-Maisonneuve is a neighbourhood in Montreal, Canada, situated in the east end of the island, generally to the south of the city's Olympic Stadium and east of downtown.

Historically a poor neighbourhood, it has experienced significant change and gentrification in recent years.

History

Early history
Hochelaga was named after the Iroquois village of the same name, first visited by explorer Jacques Cartier in 1534. The neighbourhood was at one time believed to be the location of the historic village, but modern historians and anthropologists have not reached agreement on the exact location. 

Present-day Hochelaga was founded as a rural village in 1870. Industry soon started moving in, including the Hudon and Sainte-Ann cotton mills and in 1876 the terminal and railway shops of the Quebec, Montreal, Ottawa and Occidental Railway.

In December 1883, Hochelaga was annexed to the city of Montreal against the demands of landowners. In response, they founded the village of Maisonneuve to the east, intended to be a model industrial city.

Maisonneuve grew rapidly between 1896 and 1915 and became of one Canada's largest industrial slums, commonly known as the Pittsburgh of Canada throughout the early 20th century.

These factories hired many workers, including immigrants and people from the surrounding countryside. They worked in the shoe, textile, tanning, slaughterhouse, tobacco, food, and shipbuilding industries.

In 1918, $18 million in debt, Maisonneuve was forced to annex to Montreal, consolidated the neighbourhood as Hochelaga-Maisonneuve.

The botanical garden was opened in 1931.

Decline 
The construction of major transportation infrastructures such as Highway 25 in 1967, required the demolition of some 2,000 homes and institutional buildings. These changes, combined with the movement of capital and production to Toronto, hurt the neighbourhood's economy and vitality. Many factories left the area, along with numerous residents.

In 1976 the Olympic Stadium was opened, in time for the Summer Olympics.

Beginning in the 1980s, factories started shutting down at an alarming rate, leaving the neighborhood ridden with poverty and a high concentration of welfare, especially in Hochelaga. This has led to a population exodus, high crime rates and a general negative portrait of the area.

It became particularly notorious for prostitution, which has been problematic for many years.

During the Quebec Biker War, the Hells Angels had their clubhouse in Hochelaga-Maisonneuve, which worsened its reputation for criminality.

In the most notorious incident of the guerre des motards, on 9 August 1995, a drug dealer was killed by a bomb planted in his jeep while the shrapnel badly injured an 11-year boy, Daniel Desrochers, who died of his wounds four days later.

Present day 
The 2010s were marked by increased gentrification, the arrival of students and professionals, and condo development leading to protests and some cases of vandalism of commerce. Notable areas that developed include the Promenade Ontario shopping street and the recently revitalized Place Simon Valois.

Despite this, areas continue to struggle with poverty, prostitution and drug trafficking, particularly in the south-western corner of Hochelaga on Rue Sainte-Catherine Est.

In summer 2020, in the same area, a significant number of homeless people began camping along Rue Notre-Dame, creating something akin to a tent city. This was attributed in part to the ongoing housing crisis in Montreal, significantly heightened by unemployment due to the Covid-19 pandemic, as well as overcrowding of existing shelters.

In December 2020, the camp was shut down by the police, following a fire a few days earlier and hygiene concerns. This occurred despite promises from the mayor that they would not be forcibly relocated.

However, by the summer of 2022, many of the occupants had gradually returned, and were again removed by the SPVM in June, leading to an outcry from homeless advocates and certain opposition politicians.

Features 
A notable attraction is the Olympic Park, which contains the Stadium, Olympic Tower, Saputo Stadium, Biodome, Olympic Pool and Maurice Richard Arena. The Biodome was renovated between 2018 and 2020. It reopened to the public on August 31, 2020.

Part of Parc Maisonneuve is in the neighbourhood, as it the Marché Maisonneuve, one of the city's largest public markets.

Recent features to develop include Promenade Ontario, a shopping street that becomes pedestrian in the summer to host street fairs and street performers.

The revitalized Place Simon Valois, a public square on the corner of Ontario and Valois, is home to a variety of new commerces and attractions as well.

The borough operates the Hochelaga and Maisonneuve libraries.

Geography 
A part of the borough of Mercier–Hochelaga-Maisonneuve, its borders are roughly the CP rail line west of Rue Moreau to the west, Rue Sherbrooke to the north, the train tracks east of Rue Viau to the east, and the Saint Lawrence River to the south.

Boulevard Pie-IX is the traditional dividing point between Hochelaga and Maisonneuve.

It is bordered by Ville-Marie (Centre-Sud) to the west, Rosemont–La Petite-Patrie to the north, and Mercier to the east.

Its main commercial arteries running east to west are Rue Sainte-Catherine Est, Rue Ontario, Rue Hochelaga and Avenue Pierre de Coubertin.

Transportation 
Hochelaga-Maisonneuve is served by the Préfontaine, Joliette, Pie-IX and Viau stations on the Green Line.

The following STM bus routes transit through the neighbourhood;

Popular culture
Hochelaga-Maisonneuve is prominently featured in Québécois culture and media.

Notable songs about the neighbourhood include Voyou by Les Cowboys Fringants, Hochelaga by Alexandre Poulin 
as well as La Question a 100 Piasses and Rue Ontario by Bernard Adamus.

The film Hochelaga directed by Michel Jetté and the documentary East End Forever are also about the neighbourhood.

Politics 
Hochelaga-Maisonneuve is located in the federal riding of Hochelaga, and represented by MP Soraya Martinez Ferrada of the Liberal Party.

Provincially it's located in the riding of the same name, and represented by MNA Alexandre Leduc of Québec Solidaire.

Municipally it's part of Hochelaga and  Maisonneuve–Longue-Pointe, represented by Éric Alan Caldwell and Laurence Lavigne-Lalonde of Projet Montréal at the Montreal City Council.

Notable people 
 Pierre Falardeau, film director, activist for Quebec independence
 Julien Poulin, film director and actor
 Bernard Adamus, singer-songwriter 
 Robert Guy Scully, journalist, English-rights activist
 Maurice Boucher, outlaw biker, former Hells Angels president

Education
The Commission scolaire de Montréal (CSDM) operates French-language public schools.

Elementary 
École Baril
École Notre-Dame-de-L'Assomption
École Maisonneuve
École Saint-Clément
École Saint-Jean-Baptiste-de-Lasalle

High school 
École Sécondaire Chomedey-De Maisonneuve

Specialized 
École des Métiers de la Construction de Montréal
École pour Adultes Centre Hochelaga-Maisonneuve
École Eulalie-Durocher (for intellectually disabled)

The English Montreal School Board (EMSB) operates English-language schools.

Elementary 
 Edward Murphy Elementary School (in nearby Mercier)

High school 
(for high school, students must go to nearby Vincent Massey Collegiate in Rosemont or F.A.C.E. School downtown)

See also
 Centre-Sud, nearby neighbourhood with similar background and history
 Hochelaga, federal electoral district
 Hochelaga-Maisonneuve, provincial electoral district

References

External links

Neighbourhoods in Montreal
History of Montreal
Mercier–Hochelaga-Maisonneuve
Red-light districts in Canada
Urban decay in Canada
Poverty in Canada
Gentrification in Canada
Hipster neighborhoods